Grant Township is an agricultural township in Cloud County, Kansas, USA.  As of the 2000 census, its population was 479.

History
Grant Township was organized in 1872. It was named for President Ulysses S. Grant.

Geography
According to the USGS, it contains two cemeteries: Jamestown and Saint Marys.

The streams of Cheyenne Creek, Little Cheyenne Creek, Marsh Creek and Skunk Creek run through this township.

References

 USGS Geographic Names Information System (GNIS)

External links
 US-Counties.com
 City-Data.com

Townships in Cloud County, Kansas
Townships in Kansas